Shambhupura railway station is a railway station in Chittaurgarh district, Rajasthan. Its code is SMP. The station consists of a single platform. Passenger, Express trains halt here.

References

Railway stations in Chittorgarh district
Ratlam railway division